Yelena Andreyeva (born 9 May 1969) is a Russian former track and field sprinter who specialised in the 400 metres. Her personal best for the distance was 51.30 seconds, set in 1994. She was a one-time Russian champion and took relay silver medals with Russia at the 1995 World Championships in Athletics and 1994 European Athletics Championships.

Career
Her career at the top level of athletics lasted only two years. She rose to prominence at age twenty-five, winning the 400 m title at the Russian Athletics Championships. This was the sole national title of her career, although her winning time of 51.61 seconds was the slowest ever time to merit the title.

She made her international debut at the Goodwill Games in Saint Petersburg that year, running a lifetime best of 51.30 seconds to take fifth in the 400 m before securing a 4×400 metres relay silver medal behind the United States with the Russian team of Yelena Golesheva, Yelena Ruzina, and Tatyana Zakharova. At the 1994 European Athletics Championships she was the fastest 400 m qualifier in the heats and reached the final, where she missed out on the bronze medal in fourth, beaten by Phylis Smith of Great Britain. Another relay silver medal came for her, running alongside Natalya Khrushchelyova, Zakharova and Svetlana Goncharenko, but they were some way behind the French winning team.

In her second and last year of international competition she first competed at the 1995 Summer Universiade. She repeated her European performance, topping the heats round but ending the final in fourth, this time beaten by Ukrainian rival Olena Rurak. Her first international title followed in the 4×400 m relay, as she, Yuliya Sotnikova, Khrushcheleva, and Tatyana Chebykina topped the podium. Andreyeva's final outing proved to be her highest honour as she ran the anchor leg for the Russian women's relay team of Chebykina, Goncharenko, and Sotnikova to earn the silver medal at the 1995 World Championships in Athletics (again runner-up to perennial rivals the United States).

Andreyeva did not compete internationally after 1995, although she ran at national level until 2003.

National titles
Russian Athletics Championships
400 metres: 1994

International competitions

References

External links

Living people
1969 births
Russian female sprinters
Soviet female sprinters
Universiade gold medalists for Russia
Universiade gold medalists in athletics (track and field)
Medalists at the 1995 Summer Universiade
Goodwill Games medalists in athletics
Competitors at the 1994 Goodwill Games
World Athletics Championships athletes for Russia
World Athletics Championships medalists
European Athletics Championships medalists
Russian Athletics Championships winners